K-Startup Grand Challenge is a startup accelerator program supported by the Government of South Korea. The program was launched in 2016 by the National IT Industry Promotion Agency (NIPA) and funded by the Ministry of SMEs and Startups of South Korea. The program is based in the Pangyo Techno Valley, known as the Korean version of the Silicon Valley.

As part of the government's policy, South Korea has initiated a wide range of support programs for startups and has been investing nearly $2 billion annually into the Korean start-up ecosystem since 2013. Within the scope of these efforts, the government organized the K-Startup Grand Challenge program to invite foreign start-ups to come to Korea and cooperate with local VCs and companies. Inviting start-ups from overseas is to assist Korea’s evolution into a prominent startup business hub as well.

Program Contents 
The process is composed of following contents: 
 Worldwide application usually runs for several months. Invited judges will review applications choose teams for auditions. 
 global auditions (Online) to select teams for interview and in-depth review by invited judges.
 final selection of 60 teams for participation in the accelerating program.
Demo Day will be held in Nov. 19 – 21st. Top 30 teams will be selected on the day based on their accelerating program activities and presentations. There will be also top 5 teams’ selection. Additional grant will be given to those top 30 and 5 teams in order to do business in Korea.

K-Startup Grand Challenge Programs by Years

K-Startup Grand Challenge 2016 
2,439 teams from 124 countries applied to the KSGC 2016 program. After judges reviewed documents and auditioned them, 40 startups were selected for an accelerating program. On Demo day, only half of team was selected. Those 20 teams were given addition fund from the government afterward.

K-Startup Grand Challenge 2017 
The KSGC 2017 program was expanded to 49 teams. Those of 1,515 applicants invited to Korea. The program provided the following financial support:
 round trip flight tickets for two team members.
 ₩14,000,000 to cover the living expenses during four months from August to November.
 Demo Day grants of ₩120,000,000 (1st place), ₩48,000,000 (2nd place), ₩24,000,000 (3rd place) and ₩7,200,000 (4th place).
 A total of ₩32,000,000 settlement support for each of the Top 25 teams from January to June.

K-Startup Grand Challenge 2018 
The program was expanded again. 1,771 teams applied to the program and 73 candidate teams were invited to Korea. After several months of the accelerating program, 40 teams were chosen on Demo day. The Korean Government supported those teams afterward.

K-Startup Grand Challenge 2019 

1,677 teams from 95 countries applied to the KSGC 2019 program. Invited judges reviewed all applications and chose 240 teams. Judges had auditions with 240 teams to choose teams for the accelerating program. The result of that was 38 candidate teams selected from auditions. After 38 chosen teams done with the accelerating program, 20 teams were selected on Demo day based on their accelerating program activities. The Korean Government offered aids to 20 teams afterward.

K-Startup Grand Challenge 2020 

The application period for the 2020 program is may 15 - June 25. The Demo day was presented live in conjunction with Comeup 2020 between 17–19 November 2020.

K-Startup Grand Challenge 2021 

2,568 teams from 127 countries applied to the KSGC 2021 program. The global announcement period for the 2021 program took place between Jul 5 - Jul 9 where 58 startup teams were selected to participate.

Participating startups

K-Startup Grand Challenge 2016

K-Startup Grand Challenge 2017 
AID:Tech, Ireland
Aerostate, USA
Agorize Asia, France
 Altagram GmbH, Germany
Bear Robotics Inc]., USA
 Bildeco, Indonesia
 BlockSchool, USA
 Briefy, Germany
 Box24, Thailand
andcards, South Korea — coworking space automation software.
COOLFARM, Portugal
 Crowdz, USA
 Dinlr, Singapore (Food Tech, Restaurant Tech) — Dinlr helps F&B businesses to better manage and operate their business using front-of-house solutions designed for F&B industry.
 Dream Agility, England - UK’s leading ad tech firm which specialises in Machine Learning and Artificial Intelligence to deliver excellent PPC advertising performance.
E Cycle, Hong Kong
Electroni Nose Co., Thailand
 Futurehome AS, Norway
Jarvis Store, Indonesia
Jugnoo, India
Happy Skin Vietnam, Vietnam
Hatchme Pte Ltd, Singapore
Hauzd, Panama
HeySuccess Limited, England
igloohome, Singapore
Is it fresh, Germany 
Kaitek Labs, Chile
Loka Travel Sdn Bhd, Malaysia
Marine Nexus Pte Ltd, Singapore
Mishipay Ltd., England
Mycroft AI, USA
Nanoclean Global Pvt, India
Overnest, USA
OWLR Technologies Ltd., England
Photomyne LTD., Israel
Polywed, Russia (Healthcare IT) — data-driven technology that increases in vitro fertilization (IVF) success rates.
Preply Inc., USA
Printify Inc., USA
Rezi, USA
Shift Technology, France
Slasify, Singapore
SmartPeep, Malaysia
Softinn Solutions, Malaysia
Toolyt , India
TotalCross, Brazil
Transformify, England
UAV-IQ, USA
Warrantyzen, Malaysia
Waldania Automation, Malaysia
Whitney Technology, USA
Womi Technology Co., Vietnam
ZhenHub, Hong Kong

K-Startup Grand Challenge 2018
First prize: NODIS, Singapore 
Second prize: Tespack, Finland
Third prize: XtayPro, Vietnam
Fourth prize: Lineus Medical, United States
Advantir Innovations, Singapore
 Ami, Vietnam
 AAAccell, Switzerland
 OneCharge, Hongkong
 Ohnana Tents, Netherlands
 Rely, Singapore
 Nexrea, USA
 Nitium Technology, Malaysia
 Festivality, Estonia
 Bakuun.com, United Kingdom
 DRVR, Thailand

K-Startup Grand Challenge 2019 
 IGL Coatings, Malaysia
 Kodimo, Vietnam
 Holistics Lab, Malaysia
 360F, Singapore
 Anzene, Singapore
 7 Till 8
 Backyard Brains, Chile
 Callista, Indonesia
 DETA
 Clotify
 Eyeware
 Future , Malaysia
 GIBLIB, USA
 BMPower, Russia
 Incubig, India
 Summarizebot, Latvia
 MicroX Labs, India
 TokTok, France
 Inspire Me Korea 
 Stepinshop
 Red Dino, Malaysia
 TPS Engage, Romania
 TuBudd
 Aibrid, India
 Xenon Automotive, India
 Inspire me Korea

K-Startup Grand Challenge 2020 

Filmplace, Singapore 
 SAMYROAD, Spain
 Heart Force AG, Switzerland
 Outside Technologies, Singapore
 Vouch SG Pte Ltd, Singapore

K-Startup Grand Challenge 2021 

 First prize: Khenda, Turkey
 Second prize: XQuant, South Korea
 Third prize: Scanderm, Russia
 Fourth prize: NDR Medical Technology, Singapore
 Fifth prize: Fast Pong, South Korea
 Sixth prize: Glowsome Beauty, South Korea
 Seventh prize: Fitscovery, United States
 Eighth prize: Synthillate, Philippines
 Ninth prize: Altum, United States
 Tenth prize: XP Corp (formerly known as XP Fantasy), Canada
 Founder's Lair, China
 Sendjoy, Singapore
 Vimage, Hungary
 Renaissance, Canada
 Hallo, United States
 Crmble, Spain

References

External links 
 

Startup accelerators
Venture capital
Entrepreneurship organizations
Government of South Korea